Oleg Stepko (born 25 March 1994 in Zaporizhzhya) is a Ukrainian (until 2014), Azerbaijani (2014–2018) and Russian (since March 2018) gymnast.

Career 
Oleg competed for the national team at the 2012 Summer Olympics in the Men's artistic team all-around. His teammates for the event were Mykola Kuksenkov, Igor Radivilov, Vitalii Nakonechnyi and Oleg Verniaiev. Stepko also participated in floor exercises, horizontal bar, rings

He won gold in Parallel Bars at the 2013 European Championships. At the 2013 Summer Universiade in Kazan, Stepko along with the Ukrainian team (Oleg Vernyayev, Igor Radivilov, Petro Pakhnyuk and Maksym Semiankiv) led to a second-place finish in the team final. He won the bronze medal in Pommel horse final.

References

External links

 
 

Ukrainian male artistic gymnasts
Azerbaijani male artistic gymnasts
1994 births
Living people
Sportspeople from Zaporizhzhia
Olympic gymnasts of Ukraine
Gymnasts at the 2012 Summer Olympics
Gymnasts at the 2016 Summer Olympics
Olympic gymnasts of Azerbaijan
Gymnasts at the 2010 Summer Youth Olympics
Ukrainian emigrants to Azerbaijan
Gymnasts at the 2015 European Games
European Games medalists in gymnastics
European Games gold medalists for Azerbaijan
European Games silver medalists for Azerbaijan
European Games bronze medalists for Azerbaijan
Naturalized citizens of Azerbaijan
Medalists at the World Artistic Gymnastics Championships
Universiade medalists in gymnastics
Russian male artistic gymnasts
Azerbaijani emigrants to Russia
Naturalised citizens of Russia
Universiade silver medalists for Ukraine
Universiade bronze medalists for Ukraine
Medalists at the 2013 Summer Universiade
European champions in gymnastics